Gingicithara pessulata is a species of sea snail, a marine gastropod mollusk in the family Mangeliidae.

Description
The shell of the adult snail attains 11 mm.

The whorls are not shouldered and rather flat They are rather numerously flexuously longitudinally ribbed. The interstices show revolving striae. The shell is whitish.

Distribution
This marine species occurs off the Philippines.

References

 Reeve, L.A. 1846. Monograph of the genus Mangelia. pls 1-8 in Reeve, L.A. (ed). Conchologia Iconica. London : L. Reeve & Co. Vol. 3.

External links
  Tucker, J.K. 2004 Catalog of recent and fossil turrids (Mollusca: Gastropoda). Zootaxa 682:1–1295.
 Kilburn R.N. 1992. Turridae (Mollusca: Gastropoda) of southern Africa and Mozambique. Part 6. Subfamily Mangeliinae, section 1. Annals of the Natal Museum, 33: 461–575

pessulata
Gastropods described in 1846